Šalovci is a settlement in the Municipality of Središče ob Dravi in northeastern Slovenia. The area belongs to the traditional region of Styria and is now included in the Drava Statistical Region.

References

External links
Šalovci on Geopedia

Populated places in the Municipality of Središče ob Dravi